Ambrosia is the food (sometimes the drink) of the gods of Greek mythology.

It may also refer to:

Food

Ambrosia (apple), a cultivar
Ambrosia, a type of sweet maize
Ambrosia (fruit salad), made with coconut and marshmallow

Arts and entertainment

Fictional entities

Ambrosia (Ultima), a fictional lost continent in the Ultima series of computer games
Ambrosia, a fictional alcoholic beverage in the television series Battlestar Galactica
Ambrosia, a fictional war-torn nation in the imagination of the protagonist in the film Billy Liar
Ambrosia, a fictional vaccine to the pandemic known as the "Gray Death" in the computer game Deus Ex
Ambrosia, a fictional lost kingdom in the film Professor Layton and the Eternal Diva
Ambrosia, a fictional drug in the novel Library of Souls
Ambrosia Moore, birth name of the fictional character Amber Moore from The Bold and the Beautiful and The Young and the Restless

Music

Ambrosia (band), a musical group formed in the Los Angeles area during the early 1970s 
Ambrosia (album), the debut album of the band
 "Ambrosia", a song by Alesana

Biology

Ambrosia (plant), a genus of flowering plants in the Asteraceae commonly known as ragweed
Ambrosia beetle, beetles which live in nutritional symbiosis with ambrosia fungi
Ambrosia fungi
Bee bread, also known as ambrosia or bee pollen

People

Ambrosia Anderson (born 1984), American basketball player
Ambrosia Malone (born 1998), Australian field hockey player
Ambrosia María Serrano y Rodriguez (1836–1875), Mexican clergyman and bishop
Ambrosia Tønnesen (1859–1948), Norwegian sculptor

Places

Ambrosia, West Virginia, US, an unincorporated community
193 Ambrosia, a main belt asteroid

In business

Ambrosia (food brand), a UK brand
Ambrosia Software, an American software company

Other uses
Ambrosia (Hyade), a nymph in Greek mythology
Ambrosia (neuter plural), certain festivals in honour of Dionysus